is a Japanese actress, voice actress and narrator, currently affiliated with 81 Produce and married to voice actor Mitsuaki Hoshino.

Filmography

Television animation
Attacker You! (1984), You Hazuki
Ranma ½ (1989), Atsuko, Anna and Ling-Ling
Alfred J. Kwak (1989), Winnie Wana
Moomin (1990), The Mymble
Holly the Ghost (1991), Kyandi (Candy)
Dragon Ball Z (1991), Maron
Miracle Girls (1993), Noe
Mobile Suit Victory Gundam (1993), Junko Jenko, Karel Massarik
Nintama Rantarō (1993), Torawaka Satake, Shina Yamamoto
Tenchi Universe (1995), Mecha-Washu
Pocket Monsters (1997), Shigeru Ōkido (Gary Oak)
Tenchi in Tokyo (1997), Washu Hakubi
Meizu Bakunetsu Jikū (1997), Rapier Saris
Dual! Parallel Trouble Adventure (1999), Akane Yamano
Saiyuki (2000), Kouryuu (young Genjo Sanzo), Renli
Tenchi Muyo! GXP (2002), Washu Hakubi
Black Jack (2005), Kazuo's mother
One Piece (2007), Nico Robin (temporary replacement for Yuriko Yamaguchi)
Pururun! Shizuku-chan (2007), Rainy
Bakuman (2012), Mrs. Shiratori
Ai Tenchi Muyo! (2014), Washu Hakubi
One Piece (2015), Kyuin
Unknown date
Oishinbo, Kuniko

Theatrical animation
Kiki's Delivery Service (1989), Young senpai witch
Comet in Moominland (1992), The Mymble
Tenchi the Movie: Tenchi Muyo in Love (1996), Washu Hakubi
Tenchi the Movie 2: The Daughter of Darkness (1997), Washu Hakubi
Maze Bakunetsu Jikuu: Tenpen Kyoui no Giant (1998), Rapier Saris
Tenchi Forever! The Movie (1999), Washu Hakubi

OVAs
Tenchi Muyo! Ryo-Ohki (1992), Washu Hakubi
Bastard!! (1993), Kai Harn
Please Save My Earth (1994), Ayako Okamura
Armitage III (1995), Rosalind Horhes
Maze (1996), Rapier Saris
Araiso Private High School Student Council Executive Committee (2002), Igarashi Tohru

Drama CDs
 Ao no Kiseki series 1: Ao no Kiseki (Sandra)
 Ao no Kiseki series 2: Catharsis Spell (Sandra)
 Ao no Kiseki series 3: Crystal Crown (Sandra)
 Ao no Kiseki series 4: Baroque Pearl (Sandra)
 Ao no Kiseki series 5: Persona Non Grata (Sandra)
 Ao no Kiseki series 6: Phantom Pain (Sandra)

Dubbing

Live-action
Addams Family Values, Wednesday Addams (Christina Ricci)
Annabelle: Creation, Esther Mullins (Miranda Otto)
Autumn in New York, Charlotte Fielding (Winona Ryder)
Back to the Future (2014 BS Japan edition), Stella Baines (Frances Lee McCain)
Can't Hardly Wait, Amanda Beckett (Jennifer Love Hewitt)
Charlotte's Web, Phyllis Arable (Essie Davis)
Desperado (1998 TV Asahi edition), Carolina (Salma Hayek)
Dudley Do-Right, Nell Fenwick (Sarah Jessica Parker)
EDtv, Shari (Jenna Elfman)
Existenz, Allegra Geller (Jennifer Jason Leigh)
The Full Monty, Mandy (Emily Woof)
Good Will Hunting, Skylar (Minnie Driver)
High Fidelity, Charlie Nicholson (Catherine Zeta-Jones)
How to Make an American Quilt, Finn Dodd (Winona Ryder)
I Know What You Did Last Summer, Julie James (Jennifer Love Hewitt)
Into the Wild, Billie McCandless (Marcia Gay Harden)
Jumanji, Sarah Whittle (Bonnie Hunt)
Knock Off, Ling Ho (Carman Lee)
Master and Commander: The Far Side of the World, Midshipman Lord William Blakeney (Max Pirkis)
Mystery Date, Geena Matthews (Teri Polo)
North Face (2020 BS Tokyo edition), Elisabeth Landauer (Petra Morzé)
Old School, Heidi (Juliette Lewis)
Psycho, Marion Crane (Anne Heche)
The Rainmaker, Kelly Riker (Claire Danes)
Reality Bites, Lelaina Pierce (Winona Ryder)
The River Wild, Roarke Hartman (Joseph Mazzello)
RoboCop 3, Nikko Halloran (Remy Ryan)
Rough Magic, Myra Shumway (Bridget Fonda)
Scary Movie, Buffy Gilmore (Shannon Elizabeth)
The Sinner, Sonya Barzel (Jessica Hecht)
Stanley & Iris, Kelly King (Martha Plimpton)
The Thirteenth Floor, Natasha Molinaro, Jane Fuller (Gretchen Mol)
The Wisdom of Crocodiles, Anne Levels (Elina Löwensohn)

Animation
Kid vs. Kat, Fiona
American McGee's Alice, Alice Liddell
Hey Arnold!: The Movie, Helga G. Pataki
Moomins on the Riviera, The Mymble's Daughter
Ultimate Spider-Man, Morgane le Fay
X-Men, Rogue

References

External links
Yuko Kobayashi at GamePlaza-Haruka Voice Acting Database 
Yuko Kobayashi at Hitoshi Doi's Seiyuu Database

Yuko Kobayashi at Ryu's Seiyuu Infos
Yuko Kobayashi at Twitter.

1961 births
Living people
Voice actresses from Tokyo
Japanese video game actresses
Japanese voice actresses
81 Produce voice actors